Gabriel de Luetz, Baron et Seigneur d'Aramon et de Vallabregues (died 1553), often also abbreviated to Gabriel d'Aramon, was the French Ambassador to the Ottoman Empire from 1546 to 1553, in the service first of Francis I, who dispatched him to the Ottoman Empire, and then of the French king Henry II. Gabriel de Luetz was accompanied by a vast suite of scientists, Jean de Monluc, philosopher Guillaume Postel, botanist Pierre Belon, naturalist Pierre Gilles d'Albi, the future cosmographer André Thévet, traveler Nicolas de Nicolay who would publish their findings upon their return to France and contribute greatly to the development of early science in France.

Ottoman Safavid War
In 1547, he accompanied Suleiman the Magnificent in the Ottoman–Safavid War (1532–55), with two of his secretaries, Jacques Gassut and Jean Chesneau, and is recorded as having given advice to the Sultan on some aspects of the campaign. Chesneau wrote Le Voyage de Monsieur d'Aramon dans le Levant, an interesting account of the travels of Gabriel de Luetz.

Siege of Tripoli
In 1551, Gabriel de Luetz joined the Ottoman fleet to attend to the Siege of Tripoli, with two galleys and a galliot.

Calabrian Raid
Gabriel de Luetz is also known to have convinced Suleiman to send a fleet against Charles V, for a combined Franco-Turkish action in 1552. In July 1552, the fleet raided Rhegium in Calabria, laying waste to 30 miles of coast, with Gabriel de Luetz onboard who reported the devastation in a dispatch to the king of France on 22 July:

Gabriel de Luetz was succeeded by Michel de Codignac as ambassador to the Sublime Porte, who himself was succeeded by Jean Cavenac de la Vigne.

Representation in fiction
Gabriel de Luetz (as M. d'Aramon, Baron de Luetz) plays a small but significant role in the books The Disorderly Knights and  Pawn in Frankincense, volumes three and four of the historical fiction series known as the Lymond Chronicles, by Dorothy Dunnett. The Disorderly Knights is partly set in Malta among the. Knights Hospitaller of St. John and on Tripoli at the time of that city's surrender to the Ottoman Turks in 1551. Pawn in Frankincense is partly set in Constantinople and Pera in 1553.

See also
Franco-Ottoman alliance

Notes

References

 
Fernand Braudel The Mediterranean and the Mediterranean world in the age of Philip II Volume II University of California Press, 1996 

Ambassadors of France to the Ottoman Empire
1553 deaths
1508 births
16th-century French diplomats
16th-century French people